The 1986 America East men's basketball tournament was hosted by the higher seeds in head-to-head matchups. The final was held at Matthews Arena on the campus of the Northeastern University. Only the top-8 schools made it to the 1986 tournament, therefore excluding both Colgate and Hartford. Northeastern gained its third consecutive and fifth overall America East Conference Championship and an automatic berth to the NCAA tournament with its win over Boston University. Northeastern was given the 13th seed in the East Regional of the NCAA Tournament and lost in the first round to Oklahoma 80–74. Boston University gained a bid to the NIT and lost in the first round to Providence 72–69.

Bracket and Results

See also
America East Conference

America East Conference men's basketball tournament
1985–86 ECAC North men's basketball season